Happy Wedding may refer to:
 Happy Wedding (2016 film), an Indian Malayalam-language romantic comedy film
 Happy Wedding (2018 film), an Indian Telugu-language romantic drama film

See also
 Toʻylar muborak or Happy Wedding Day!, a 1978 Uzbek comedy film